The governor of the Bank of England is the most senior position in the Bank of England. It is nominally a civil service post, but the appointment tends to be from within the bank, with the incumbent grooming their successor. The governor of the Bank of England is also chairman of the Monetary Policy Committee, with a major role in guiding national economic and monetary policy, and is therefore one of the most important public officials in the United Kingdom.

According to the original charter of 27 July 1694 the bank's affairs would be supervised by a governor, a deputy governor, and 24 directors. In its current incarnation, the bank's Court of Directors has 12 (or up to 14) members, of whom five are various designated executives of the bank.

The 121st and current governor is Andrew Bailey, who began his term in March 2020.

Governors of the Bank of England (1694–present)

See also

 Chief Cashier of the Bank of England
 Deputy Governor of the Bank of England

References

External links

 List of Governors of the Bank of England 

Monetary Policy Committee members
Bank of England
1694 establishments in England
England